David Alan "Dave" Dawson (born October 5, 1973) is an American politician and lawyer from Iowa. A Democrat, he served in the Iowa House of Representatives representing the 14th district from 2013 to 2017.  He has a bachelor's degree in sociology and psychology from Iowa State University and a J.D. from the UCLA School of Law.

, Dawson serves on several committees in the Iowa House – the Commerce, Human Resources, Judiciary, and Public Safety committees.  He also serves as a member of the Justice System Appropriations Subcommittee.

Early life and education
Dawson was born in Cherokee, Iowa, and raised in Washta, Iowa. He graduated as Valedictorian from Willow Community High School in 1992. Dawson obtained his degree in Sociology and Psychology from Iowa State University in 1996 and received his Juris Doctor from the University of California, Los Angeles in 1999.

Career
After graduating law school, Dawson worked as an attorney with the Law Firm of Winston & Strawn in Chicago. After his time here, Dawson became a prosecutor for the Woodbury County Attorney's Office. In 2010, he started his own law office focussing on children and families. Since 2015, he has served as an Assistant County Attorney in the Juvenile Division of the Woodbury County Attorney's Office in Iowa.

Electoral history

Organizations
Dawson is a member of the following organizations:
 Iowa State Bar Association
 Woodbury County Bar Association
 Redeemer Lutheran Church

Family
Dawson is married to his wife Liza and she has three children. The family resides in Woodbury Heights, Iowa.

References

External links

 Representative Dave Dawson official Iowa General Assembly site
 
 Financial information (state office) at the National Institute for Money in State Politics
 Iowa House Democrats
 LinkedIn Profile

1973 births
Living people
Democratic Party members of the Iowa House of Representatives
Politicians from Sioux City, Iowa
Iowa State University alumni
UCLA School of Law alumni
21st-century American politicians